Solvent may refer to:
Solvent, a liquid that dissolves another material
Solvent (producer), the stage name of electronic musician Jason Amm
Solvency, a company's capability to meet its financial obligations
"Solvent", a song on the 1984 Skinny Puppy album Remission
"solvent", a song on the 2013 Skinny Puppy album Weapon

See also 

Solvation
Solvent cabinet
Solvent exposure
Solvent extraction